George De Peana (5 July 1936 – 26 July 2021) was a Guyanese Olympic long-distance runner and trade union leader. 

De Peana represented his country in the men's 5000 meters at the 1960 Summer Olympics. His time was 15:54.2. De Peana finished fourth in the 1959 Pan American Games 10000 metres and fifth in the 1959 Pan American Games 5000 metres.  In 1957, he jointly won the Guyanese Sportsman of the Year award.

After his sporting career, De Peana moved into trade unionism, becoming secretary of the Clerical and Commercial Workers' Union, then secretary of the Guyana Trades Union Congress, and from 1998 until 2007 was secretary of the Caribbean Congress of Labour.

References

1936 births
2021 deaths
Sportspeople from Georgetown, Guyana
Guyanese male long-distance runners
Guyanese trade unionists
Olympic athletes of British Guiana
Athletes (track and field) at the 1960 Summer Olympics
Pan American Games competitors for British Guiana
Athletes (track and field) at the 1959 Pan American Games
Commonwealth Games competitors for British Guiana
Athletes (track and field) at the 1958 British Empire and Commonwealth Games